Petersham Lodge is a Grade II listed house on River Lane, Petersham in the London Borough of Richmond upon Thames. Rebuilt in the early 18th century for Catherine Douglas, Duchess of Queensberry, it is a former grace-and-favour mansion.

Notable residents
On the death in 1779 of William Stanhope, 2nd Earl of Harrington, the lease was bought by Thomas Pitt, 1st Baron Camelford who purchased the fee simple in 1784 from the Crown, an act of Parliament having been passed for that purpose. The house was repaired and redecorated by John Soane in 1781. In 1790 it was sold by him to the Duke of Clarence (who later became William IV). Matthew Banckes rebuilt it for Laurence Hyde, 1st Earl of Rochester in 1791–92. James Hamilton, Viscount Hamilton was born there in 1786.

Prince Rupert Loewenstein, the long-time financial manager of the rock band The Rolling Stones, lived at Petersham Lodge until his death in 2014, having purchased it for about £2 million in 1987.

References

External links
Moses, John, The history of Petersham Lodge. Kew Society, October 2021. Retrieved 3 October 2021.

18th-century establishments in England
Grade II listed buildings in the London Borough of Richmond upon Thames
Grade II listed houses in London
Houses completed in the 18th century
Houses in the London Borough of Richmond upon Thames
Petersham, London